Verisk Extreme Event Solutions (formerly AIR Worldwide) is an American risk modeling and data analytics company headquartered in Boston, Massachusetts, with customers in insurance, reinsurance, financial services, and government markets. Verisk Extreme Event Solutions specializes in catastrophe modeling software and services to manage the probability of loss from natural catastrophes, terrorism, pandemics, casualty catastrophes, and cyber incidents. It is led by current President Bill Churney and operates nine offices internationally.

History
Karen Clark, the developer of the first commercial hurricane catastrophe model, founded Applied Insurance Research in 1987, with CATMAP as its first product introduced later that same year. CATMAP provided a catastrophe loss analysis system for treaty insurers and reinsurers in particular. In late August 1992, AIR published results from its U.S. Hurricane Model that estimated insured losses for Hurricane Andrew's landfall in southern Florida could come to surpass $13 billion. The estimate, which was met with skepticism at the time, was later validated by insurance claims and renewed interest in catastrophe modeling for estimating risk due to extreme events "almost overnight."  Over ten major insurance companies faced insolvency as a result of Hurricane Andrew alone.

Applied Insurance Research was privately held until it was acquired by ISO in 2002 and renamed AIR Worldwide; Verisk Analytics later formed as a parent holding company for ISO. Analyze Re, a software analytics provider for the reinsurance and insurance industries, became a part of AIR's operational domain in 2016, and then Arium, a company specializing in liability risk modeling, followed in 2017.

In January 2022, AIR Worldwide transitioned to the Verisk brand and is now Verisk Extreme Event Solutions.

Operations
Verisk developed Touchstone, a risk management platform intended to provide companies with assessments of their estimated exposure to loss from extreme events. Results are used in pricing, underwriting, and risk management. Verisk released its fifth version of the Touchstone platform in 2017. Touchstone Re, a separate application for assessing the risk to reinsurance portfolios, industry loss warranties, and insurance-linked securities, has been announced for August 2018.

Awards
The company received the 2016 Data Analytics Project of the Year/ The Bedrock Award from Digital Insurance Awards  and the Risk Modeler of the Year in 2017 from Reactions. Its cyber risk product ARC (Analytics of Risk from Cyber) received the InsuranceERM Americas Cyber Solution of the Year Award for 2020.

References

External links
 AIR Worldwide Official website

1987 establishments in Massachusetts
Risk management companies
Disaster management
Software companies based in Massachusetts